Mirai is a Maldivian crime thriller web series written and directed by Azhan Ibrahim. It stars Washiya Mohamed, Sharaf Abdulla, Mohamed Ishfan and Aishath Shaaya in main roles. The pilot episode of the series was released on 8 January 2023. The series is based on the lives of different individuals running from their mistakes, facing the hard truths of life and trying to change their destiny. It follows a happy family falling apart due the untimely death of their only child and the journey the couples take to avenge the murderer.

Cast and characters

Main
 Washiya Mohamed as Mira
 Sharaf Abdulla as Mohamed Sameen
 Mohamed Ishfan as Tony
 Aishath Shaaya as Aishath Shaaya

Recurring
 Izkan Mamdhooh as Mizkan "Mizzy"
 Fazil Fayaz as Ibrahim Zufar
 Aisha Ali as Fareesha
 Ahmed Sharif
 Fathimath Visama as Zumra; Shaaya's friend
 Ibrahim Saalim as Anoof; Tony's friend
 Abdulla Zaleeshan as Ziyatte
 Mariyam Shima as Mihudha
 Usaid Ahmed
 Ravee Farooq as MP Yaugoob
 Mohamed Afrah as Shaaya's uncle
 Fathimath Azifa
 Ahmed Abaan as Fiyaz
 Jameela Ibrahim as Sameen's mother

Guest
 Zack Ahmed as Tony's friend (Episode 2)
 Ahmed Saeed as Dhanish (Episode 4)
 Mohamed Shivaz as Fathuhee (Episode 8)
 Mohamed Musthafa as Thaube (Episode 9)

Episodes

Soundtrack
A promotional song of the web series titled "Umurah", sung by Falih Adam and Aishath Shamahath was released on 24 December 2022.

Release and reception
Following the success of Azhan Ibrahim's crime thriller web series Dharaka (2021), Ibrahim announced his upcoming project titled Mirai on 8 August 2022. Filming for the series commence in September 2022 and completed in December 2022.

The first episode of the series was released on 8 January 2023 through Baiskoafu. Reviewing the pilot episode of the series, Ahmed Jaishan from Sun praised the direction by Azhan Ibrahim and "how smartly he builds suspense from the very first scene to the last".

References

Serial drama television series
Maldivian television shows
Maldivian web series